Filippo Piva (born 22 August 1967) is a Sammarinese swimmer. He competed at the 1988 Summer Olympics and the 1992 Summer Olympics.

References

1967 births
Living people
Sammarinese male swimmers
Olympic swimmers of San Marino
Swimmers at the 1988 Summer Olympics
Swimmers at the 1992 Summer Olympics
Place of birth missing (living people)